The prairie sphinx moth or Wiest's primrose sphinx (Euproserpinus wiesti) is a species of moth in the  family Sphingidae. It is found from north-eastern California through central Nevada and most of Utah to north-eastern Arizona and northern three-quarters of New Mexico and most of Colorado, and further eastward into extreme western portions of Kansas, Oklahoma and Texas. The habitat consists of sand washes and prairie blow-outs.

The wingspan is 32–49 mm.

There is one generation per year with adults on wing from May to June. Adults nectar at flowers during the day.

Larvae have been recorded feeding on Oenothera latifolia.

References

Sources
 

Euproserpinus
Moths of North America
Moths described in 1939
Taxonomy articles created by Polbot